Persicula phrygia is a species of sea snail, a marine gastropod mollusk, in the family Cystiscidae.

References

phrygia
Gastropods described in 1846
Cystiscidae